Chantelle Whitney Brown-Young (born July 27, 1994), known professionally as Winnie Harlow, is a Canadian fashion model and public spokesperson on the skin condition vitiligo. She gained prominence in 2014 as a contestant on the 21st cycle of the U.S. television series America's Next Top Model. In 2016, Harlow became the first model with vitiligo to walk in the Victoria's Secret Fashion Show. She also appeared in the Beyoncé-directed HBO visual album Beyoncé: Lemonade (2016). She was honored as one of the BBC 100 Women in 2018. Harlow later served as a judge on the second season of the Amazon Prime Video series Making the Cut.

Early life
Winnie Harlow was born Chantelle Brown-Young on July 27, 1994, in the Greater Toronto Area, the daughter of Lisa Brown and Windsor Young. She is of Jamaican ancestry and has two sisters. She was diagnosed with the chronic skin condition vitiligo, characterized by depigmentation of portions of the skin, at the age of four. Harlow was a victim of bullying by other children and was reportedly called a "cow, zebra, and all manner of other disparaging slurs" throughout her childhood by students both black and white. The verbal harassment led to her changing schools numerous times and dropping out of high school, after which she contemplated suicide.

Career

Modelling
Harlow was discovered by America's Next Top Model host Tyra Banks on Instagram, and subsequently became one of the 14 finalists of the 21st cycle in 2014. She was the only Canadian ever cast on ANTM. She was eliminated in the second week of the finals, and participated in a separate competition called the "comeback series", where she continued to participate in the cycle's photo shoots along with the other eliminated contestants in an effort to return to the competition. After completing the comeback series, she was revealed to have received the highest average public vote score, and returned. She was eliminated again in episode 13, being the ninth eliminated overall.

Following her elimination from America's Next Top Model, Harlow modelled for the Spanish clothing brand Desigual and became its official brand representative. In September 2014, she walked and closed for the clothing brand Ashish for its spring/summer 2015 collection in London Fashion Week. She has modelled for fashion magazines such as i-D and Dazed, and for the fashion website Showstudio.com. In 2015, Harlow modelled for the Italian clothing brand Diesel for its spring/summer 2015 campaign, which was shot by British fashion photographer Nick Knight. She modelled for the Spanish and Italian editions of Glamour magazine and was featured in the August/September 2015 issue of Complex magazine. She was also featured in the August 2015 issue of Cosmopolitan. She was featured on Vogue Italias website in an interview and accompanying photo shoot. In August 2015, Harlow shot the cover of and an accompanying editorial spread in the September issue of Ebony magazine, where she appeared alongside former America's Next Top Model contestant Fatima Siad. In 2016, Harlow was featured in a commercial for Sprite, and was featured in a campaign for Swarovski. The same year, she was chosen as one of BBC's 100 Women In 2018, she modelled at the Victoria's Secret Fashion Show.

Harlow has appeared in advertising campaigns for Fendi, Marc Jacobs, Tommy Hilfiger, Desigual, Diesel, Swarovski, Steve Madden, Nike, Puma, MAC and Victoria's Secret.

Vitiligo public speaking
In July 2011, Harlow posted a video titled "Vitiligo: A Skin Condition, not a Life Changer" on YouTube. She talked about the condition and answered questions about her life living with vitiligo. In November 2014, Harlow spoke in a TEDx presentation, recalling her experience with it. She was presented with the 'Role Model' award at the 2015 Portuguese GQ Men of The Year event.

2018 Canadian Grand Prix
At the 2018 Canadian Grand Prix, Harlow was invited to wave the chequered flag, signifying the end of the race. A miscommunication between race officials led to Harlow being instructed to wave the flag on what should have been the penultimate lap of the race. As a result of the application of the Formula One sporting regulations, the final result was declared based on the positions at the end of lap 68 (i.e., the official race distance was shortened by two laps from the scheduled distance of 70 laps). The error did not seriously impact the race result.

Other work
Harlow has appeared in music videos; these including JMSN's "The One", Eminem's "Guts Over Fear", Calvin Harris' "Promises", and Black Eyed Peas' "Where's the Love?". She cameoed in Beyoncé's "visual album" Lemonade and was in a video of Lilly Singh (a.k.a. IISuperwomanII) on YouTube named "Three Girls, One Elevator".

In March 2022 Harlow founded the sun care and skincare brand Cay Skin, claiming she was influenced to do so after being badly sunburned on a photoshoot, where the photographer requested she not reapply sunscreen—to avoid the white cast most sunscreen products leave in photos.

Filmography

Television

Music videos

Awards and nominations

References

External links

 
 
 
 

1994 births
America's Next Top Model contestants
BBC 100 Women
Black Canadian women
Female models from Ontario
Canadian people of Jamaican descent
Living people
People from Toronto
People with vitiligo
The Society Management models